Joe Carr (c. 1931 - 19 May 2015) was a Scottish footballer who played as a Winger and played much of his career with St Johnstone.

Carr joined the Perth club from Dunipace Juniors in 1953 and went on to make 182 appearances for the club scoring 58 goals in the process, Carr went on to finish his career with Dumbarton.

References

Scottish footballers
St Johnstone F.C. players
1930s births
2015 deaths
Dumbarton F.C. players
Scottish Football League players
Association football wingers
Date of birth missing
Dunipace F.C. players